Steve Worthington is an Australian former professional rugby league footballer who played in the 1980s. He played for Illawarra in the New South Wales Rugby League (NSWRL) competition.

Playing career
Worthington made his first grade debut in round 3 of the 1984 NSWRL season against Canterbury at Belmore Sports Ground. Worthington would go on to become a consistent member of the Illawarra side over the next five years playing 80 matches. However, his time at the club was not particularly successful with Illawarra claiming two Wooden Spoon's in 1985 and 1986.

References

Illawarra Steelers players
Australian rugby league players
Rugby league props
Rugby league locks
Rugby league second-rows
1964 births
Living people
Place of birth missing (living people)